deLendrecie's Department Store was a department store located in Fargo, North Dakota.

The Original O.J. deLendecie Company building at 620 thru 624 Main Avenue in Fargo was listed on the National Register of Historic Places in 1979. In 1972 during development of the West Acres Mall, deLendrecie's moved its entire Fargo location to the newly built mall as its largest opening anchor tenant.

The department store offered mid-range dry goods, housewares, luxury personal items and imported luxury items from Europe. deLendrecie's was eventually sold to the Dillard's Department store company and later sold again to Herberger's Department Stores of St. Cloud, Minnesota.

The original O.J. deLendrecie Company building was built in 1894 in Late 19th and 20th Century Revivals and Richardsonian Classical style, and was designed by McMillen & Tenbusch (1894) and by Andrew J. O'Shea (1904 addition).

The original store was prominently located in downtown Fargo near the Northern Pacific Railroad Depot on Main Avenue. The building was expanded vertically in 1904 as deLendrecie changed the name of his store from The Chicago Dry Goods House to The O.J. deLendrecie Company.

deLendrecie's Department store was rebranded as a Herberger's in 1998 bringing almost 100 years of service to the Fargo/Moorhead area to a close.

In 2020 the deLendrecies name was revived as an online shopping destination. Site

References

Commercial buildings on the National Register of Historic Places in North Dakota
Buildings and structures in Fargo, North Dakota
Commercial buildings completed in 1894
Richardsonian Romanesque architecture in North Dakota
Department stores on the National Register of Historic Places
National Register of Historic Places in Cass County, North Dakota
Individually listed contributing properties to historic districts on the National Register in North Dakota